Sonodyne Electronics Co. Pvt Ltd. (also known as Sonodyne) is an Indian electronics company based in Kolkata, India, founded in the 1970s by Ashoke Mukherjee. It specializes in audio equipments, amplifiers, speakers and active speakers. Their studio products division operates in over 40 nations. Sonodyne currently operates 2 research labs, in Kolkata and Mumbai. Sales and project offices are located in Mumbai, Bangalore, Delhi and Kolkata. Two design centres and three manufacturing centres are located in Kolkata, West Bengal and Mumbai, Maharastra.

The company began when Mukherjee, an engineering student from IIT Roorkee, began designing amplifiers and speakers. Loudspeakers and turntables went on the market in the mid 1970s, and component audio systems in the mid 1980s. Around the same time, manufacturing and research was moved to Special Economic Zone, Mumbai.

See also 
 List of studio monitor manufacturers

References

External links

Audio equipment manufacturers of India
Loudspeaker manufacturers
Indian brands
Manufacturing companies based in Kolkata
1970s establishments in West Bengal